Ernst Frick may refer to:
Ernst Frick (painter) (1881–1956), Swiss painter
Ernst Frick (footballer), Swiss footballer